Steve Fox is an American politician and former member of the California State Assembly. A Democrat, Fox represented the 36th district, encompassing much of the Antelope Valley and Santa Clarita Valley, as well as small portions of Kern County and San Bernardino County. Prior to being elected to the state Assembly, he worked as a public school teacher, an attorney, and trustee of Antelope Valley College. Fox formerly served as a governing board member of the Antelope Valley Hospital. Fox ran for Assembly in 2008 as a Republican and lost the Republican primary to Steve Knight, who went on to win the general election. Fox later switched his political affiliation and became a Democrat.

Fox won his seat in 2012 by only 145 votes over his Republican opponent, Lancaster City Councilman Ron Smith. He became the first Democrat to win election to the legislature in the area in 36 years, despite having been outspent in the election by more than 12-to-one.  In 2014, Fox sought a second term to the state Assembly, losing to Palmdale City Councilman Tom Lackey by a 60% to 40% margin.

Fox ran again for the state Assembly against Lackey in 2016, however he lost by a 54% to 46% margin.

Fox sought another rematch against Lackey in 2018.  He lost again, but by a smaller margin than in the previous two elections.

Fox sought another rematch  against Lackey in 2020.  He lost by a wider margin than in the prior two campaigns.

In 2022, Fox sought election to the California State Assembly in the newly drawn 39th District.  He was defeated in the primary by a wide margin.

Lawsuits and settlements
Fox was charged with sexually harassing two female employees in 2014 while in the State Assembly. A former legislative director claimed that he exposed himself to her when she drove to his residence to give him a ride to work, that she was asked to perform non-legislative related tasks for Fox, and that she was fired when she reported his behavior. In October 2017, the California State Assembly paid $100,000 to the plaintiff to settle the case. 
 
A second former aide charged that he forced her to work on his campaigns and for his law firm without pay while she was employed on his staff, though she didn't accuse him of sexual misconduct. The State Assembly paid $110,000 settlement in 2015 to settle the lawsuit.

California State Assembly

2012 election

2014 election

2016 election

2018 election

2020 election

District 39

Personal life
Fox and his wife Sharon, a retired school teacher, have been married for 32 years. They have two children, Rebecca Fox, a First 5 Los Angeles organizer, and Joshua Fox, a police officer. They have three grandchildren.

References

External links 
 Law Firm Facebook Page

Democratic Party members of the California State Assembly
Living people
People from Palmdale, California
California lawyers
1953 births
21st-century American politicians